The lieutenant governor of Montana is an elected official in the State of Montana that ranks just below the governor of Montana.

List of lieutenant governors
Parties

References

Montana
Lieut